Ornithinaemia is a blood disorder characterized by high levels of ornithine.  Also known as hyperornithinemia, it may be associated with psychomotor retardation or epileptic episodes.

References

Blood disorders